This is a summary of 1981 in music in the United Kingdom, including the official charts from that year.

Events
9 February - Phil Collins releases his first solo album (although he will not leave the band Genesis until 1995)
14 February - Billy Idol leaves Generation X to begin a solo career
4 April - Bucks Fizz win the Eurovision Song Contest with "Making Your Mind Up"
7 April - Former Who manager Kit Lambert dies after falling down a flight of stairs in his mother's home in London.
17 April - Eric Clapton is released from St. Paul's Hospital in Minnesota following a month-long treatment for bleeding ulcers.
18 April - Yes announce that they are breaking up. (They would, however, reunite frequently in years to come).
25 April - Paul McCartney's band, Wings, breaks up officially
2 May - Working as a local wedding singer 12 months previously, Scottish vocalist Sheena Easton hits No.1 in the US with "Morning Train (9 to 5)"
11 May - The musical Cats begins its 8,949 performance run on London's West End.
August - The success of Stars on 45 leads to a short-lived medley craze. The most successful imitator of the Stars on 45 format is, rather unexpectedly, the Royal Philharmonic Orchestra, whose "Hooked on Classics (Parts 1&2)" reaches number two in the charts.
14 September - Emma Kirkby and Gothic Voices record the album A Feather on the Breath of God in St Jude-on-the-Hill, Hampstead Garden Suburb, London.

Charts

Number-one singles

Number-one albums

Year-end charts
The tables below include sales between 1 January and 31 December 1981: the year-end charts reproduced in the issue of Music Week dated 26 December 1981 and played on Radio 1 on 3 January 1982 only include sales figures up until 12 December 1981.

Best-selling singles
At the end of 1981, the official year-end charts provided by the UK's chart provider, the British Market Research Bureau, stated that the best-selling single of the year was "Tainted Love" by Soft Cell. However, in March 2021, the Official Charts Company announced that new research had shown that "Don't You Want Me" by the Human League, previously thought to be the year's 21st-biggest seller, was in fact the biggest-selling single of 1981 with over one million sales, and the year-end charts were adjusted accordingly.

Best-selling albums

Notes:

Classical music: new works
Peter Maxwell Davies - Piano Sonata
George Lloyd - Symphony No 10, November Journeys (for brass)
Adrian Williams - String Quartet No. 2

Opera
Iain Hamilton - Anna Karenina

Musical theatre
11 May - Cats, with music by Andrew Lloyd Webber, opens in London's West End.
16 December - Alan Ayckbourn's Making Tracks, with music by Paul Todd, opens at the Stephen Joseph Theatre, Scarborough.

Musical films
Concert for Kampuchea
Dance Craze
Urgh! A Music War

Births
11 January
Jamelia, singer
Tom Meighan, lead singer of Kasabian
22 January - Sarah Davies, bassist (Hepburn)
19 January - Thaila Zucchi, singer (allSTARS*) and actress
24 February - Gwilym Simcock, pianist and composer
11 March - Russell Lissack, guitarist with Bloc Party
13 March - Ivo Neame, jazz pianist and saxophonist
20 March - Declan Bennett, singer (Point Break)
26 March - Jay Sean, singer
1 April - Hannah Spearritt, actress and singer (S Club 7)
2 April - Linzi Martin, singer (Girl Thing)
10 April - Liz McClarnon, singer (Atomic Kitten)
21 April - Mike Christie, baritone (G4)
26 April - Ms Dynamite, singer
4 May - Ryan Elliott, singer (Ultimate Kaos)
5 May - Craig David, singer
20 May - Sean Conlon, musician (5ive)
22 May - Su-Elise Nash, singer (Mis-Teeq)
23 May - Gwenno Saunders, singer
5 June - Anika Bostelaar, Dutch-born singer (Girl Thing)
20 June - Derek McDonald, singer (Mero)
22 June - Chris Urbanowicz, guitarist (Editors)
23 June - Antony Costa, singer (Blue)
27 June - Colin and Joe O'Halloran, Irish singers (Reel)
12 July - Rebecca Hunter, singer (allSTARS*)
19 July - Didz Hammond, singer and bass player (Dirty Pretty Things and The Cooper Temple Clause)
24 July - Lisa Lister, guitarist (Hepburn)
8 August - Bradley McIntosh, singer (S Club 7)
11 August - Sandi Thom, singer-songwriter
21 August - Jenilca Giusti, Puerto Rican-born singer (Solid HarmoniE)
29 September - Suzanne Shaw, singer (Hear'Say) and actress
6 October - Sarah Keating, Irish singer (Six)
10 October - Una Healy, Irish singer (The Saturdays)
13 October - Kele Okereke, singer (Bloc Party)
31 October - Liam McKenna, Northern Irish singer (Six)
17 November - Sarah Harding, singer (Girls Aloud) (d. 2021)
20 November - Kimberley Walsh, singer (Girls Aloud)
22 November - Ben Adams, singer (A1)
26 November - Natasha Bedingfield, singer
19 December - Sam Bloom, singer (allSTARS*)

Deaths
19 February 
Olive Gilbert, actress and singer, 82 
Frank Merrick, pianist, 95
21 February – Ron Grainer, Australian-born electronic music pioneer and composer involved with the BBC Radiophonic Workshop, 58 (spinal cancer)
10 March – Bill Hopkins, pianist, composer and critic, 37 (heart attack)
7 April – Kit Lambert, manager and producer, 45
8 April – Eric Rogers, composer, 59
14 April – Christian Darnton, composer, 75
21 April – Ivor Newton, pianist and accompanist, 88
28 April – Steve Currie, bassist of T.Rex, 33 (car crash)
12 May – Frank Weir, orchestra leader and jazz musician, 70
23 September – Sam Costa, dance band singer and DJ, 71
15 October – Elsie Randolph, actress, dancer and singer, 77
13 December – Cornelius Cardew, experimental music composer, 45 (hit-and-run car accident)
date unknown – Albert Ernest Sims,  composer, conductor and music director of The Central Band of H.M. Royal Air Force, 85

See also 
 1981 in British radio
 1981 in British television
 1981 in the United Kingdom
 List of British films of 1981

References 

 
British music
British music by year